Jørgen Friis was a Roman Catholic prelate who served as Bishop of Viborg (1521–1536).

Biography
On 7 Jan 1521, Jørgen Friis was appointed during the papacy of Pope Leo X as Bishop of Viborg. He served as Bishop of Viborg until his resignation in 1536.

References 

16th-century Roman Catholic bishops in Denmark
Bishops appointed by Pope Leo X